The Basej-e Milli alternatively called Rawand-e Sabz-e Afghanistan was a political party in Afghanistan created by former Afghan intelligence chief Amrullah Saleh (2004–2010).

History
Basej-e Milli started as a grassroots movement when Saleh visited cities and small towns in several Afghan provinces talking about his political beliefs in favour of democracy and reform but strongly opposing the Taliban. In May 2011, more than 100,000 of Saleh's followers took part in an anti-Taliban demonstration in the capital Kabul.

See also 
 Basij
 The Student Basij

References

Islamic political parties in Afghanistan
Islamic democratic political parties
2010 establishments in Afghanistan
Political parties established in 2010
Centrist parties in Asia